William Wilfred Parr (23 April 1915 – 8 March 1942) was an England amateur International footballer and an English professional footballer who played as an outside right for Blackpool, Dulwich Hamlet and Arsenal. He joined Arsenal in May 1939 but his first game with the team was not until almost a year later during World War II, in April 1940 at Southend. He then joined the Royal Air Force Volunteer Reserve.

England amateur football career
Parr took part in the 1937 Tour of New Zealand, Australia and Ceylon by the England Amateur National Team.

Death
A Sergeant in the Royal Air Force Volunteer Reserve, Parr was one of three crewmen on board the Lockheed Hudson V serial number AM535 of No. 233 Squadron RAF based at RAF St Eval, who were killed when it crashed in a field at Lower Treburrick Farm, St Ervan, four miles north east of RAF St Mawgan in Cornwall, on the night of 8 March 1942. The three airmen were conducting a training exercise, but overshot the airfield and crashed, killing pilot Parr and the other two on board.

References

External links

1915 births
1942 deaths
English footballers
England amateur international footballers
Blackpool F.C. players
Dulwich Hamlet F.C. players
Arsenal F.C. players
English Football League players
Association football outside forwards
Royal Air Force Volunteer Reserve personnel of World War II
Royal Air Force personnel killed in World War II
Sportspeople from Blackpool
Aviators killed in aviation accidents or incidents in England
Victims of aviation accidents or incidents in 1942
Royal Air Force pilots of World War II
Military personnel from Lancashire
British World War II bomber pilots
Royal Air Force airmen